The Aceh Unity Party is a regional political party in Indonesia.   The party's first leader was Farhan Hamid, a member of the legislature from the National Mandate Party (PAN). It contested the 2009 elections in the province of Aceh, but won only 16,602 votes, 0.77% of the Aceh vote. It failed to qualify for the 2014 elections.

References

Political parties in Indonesia